The following is the qualification system and qualified athletes for the Surfing at the 2019 Pan American Games competitions.

Qualification
A total of 88 surfers will qualify across various qualification tournaments. The host nation Peru, will be automatically be allocated ten quota spots across the eight events. In the open surf category, a country can enter two athletes, with a maximum one in all other categories. A country can enter a maximum ten surfers (five per gender). An athlete can only qualify one quota for their country.

Qualification timeline

Qualification summary
The following is the qualification summary after the PASA Surf Games.

Men

Open surf

Argentina was one of the two nations to qualify through the Worlds, however later the country qualified two slots at the PASA Surf Games, meaning this spot was reallocated to the next best nation, Canada.

SUP surf

SUP race

APP Sup World Tour spot was reallocated to the best ranked athlete not qualified from the PASA Surf Games

Longboard

Women

Open

SUP surf

SUP race

APP Sup World Tour spot was reallocated to the best ranked athlete not qualified from the PASA Surf Games

Longboard

References

P
P
Qualification for the 2019 Pan American Games
Qualification